SAK or sak can stand for:
 Central Organisation of Finnish Trade Unions (Suomen Ammattiliittojen Keskusjärjestö in Finnish)
 Finnish Federation of Trade Unions, forerunner of the Central Organisation of Finnish Trade Unions
 Secure attention key
 SAK Comedy Lab, an Improvisational Comedy Theater in Orlando, Florida, United States
 Steve Kaufman, nickname given by his mentor Andy Warhol
 Swiss Army knife
 Studien zur Altägyptischen Kultur, an academic Egyptological journal
 The IATA airport code for Sauðárkrókur Airport, Skagafjörður,  Iceland
 ISO 639-2 (alpha-3) code for the Shake or Sake language, spoken in Gabon
 Siumut Amerdlok Kunuk, a football and handball club in Greenland